Susan Dibny (née Dearbon) is a fictional character from DC Comics associated with the Elongated Man. Created by John Broome and Carmine Infantino, the character first appeared in Flash vol. 1 #119 (March 1961). In 2004, she became a flashpoint for discussions of women in comics when a highly controversial storyline was published (set in the post-Zero Hour continuity) in which she is murdered and revealed to have been raped by Doctor Light in the past.

Sue Dearbon appears in live action portrayed by Natalie Dreyfuss starting in the sixth season of the Arrowverse television series The Flash.

Fictional character biography
Sue is the wife of hero Ralph Dibny, the Elongated Man. She is a brunette socialite from Westchester County, New York, United States. She has at times worked for the Justice League as an administrator. Ralph and Sue share a very loving relationship. They met when Ralph crashed her debutante ball, using the pretense of jewel thieves to catch a glimpse of the lovely Sue. What followed was a whirlwind romance. Sue and Ralph married a short time later with Barry Allen serving as the best man. What followed was a life of adventures and super-heroics, as Sue stuck by Ralph's side as he traveled around the globe as part of the Justice League. This led to the various dangers associated with the lifestyle, including her near-death at the tentacles of an alien parasite and being kidnapped by a supervillain, Sonar I, to become his consort. Through it all, Sue and Ralph stuck together, even when the going got tough, eventually settling in Opal City.

Super Buddies

Sue is a member of the Super Buddies team made up of former members of the Justice League. As she has no superpowers herself, she spends most of the time at the Super Buddies headquarters, arguing with team founder Maxwell Lord.

Death

The 2004 DC murder mystery Identity Crisis begins with Sue's death at the hands of Jean Loring while she was expecting a child. Attempting to reunite with her husband Ray Palmer, Loring had used his equipment to try to create a threat to the families of other superheroes in an attempt to prompt Ray to come back to her. Although Loring hadn't intended for Sue to be seriously hurt, by traveling down the phone line to 'jump' into Sue's brain, she unintentionally caused an aneurysm that killed Sue. Loring then panicked and severely burned Sue's body to mask the true cause of her death. Over the course of the series, it is revealed that in the past Sue was raped by Doctor Light. In an attempt to prevent him from harming members of other superheroes' families, Justice League member Zatanna attempted to magically rehabilitate Doctor Light, which accidentally resulted in the villain becoming less intelligent and very incompetent. Batman, in fact, wanted another punishment for Dr. Light but his mind was also mindwiped by Zatanna, erasing his memory of his involvement in events. Light is the prime suspect until Doctor Mid-Nite and Mr. Terrific carried out an autopsy and confirmed that Sue had not been killed by anything that would constitute Light's standard M.O., with a casual comment Jean made to Ray prompting him to realize the truth, resulting in him sending Jean to Arkham and disappearing from the JLA. During a Sinestro Corps War one-shot, Superboy-Prime mentioned that his anger over what happened to Sue Dibny as one of his reasons for his actions during Infinite Crisis, seeing it as further 'proof' of the failures of the new universe, not knowing that he is inadvertently responsible for causing the chain of events that led to her rape and death after he fractured the timeline (Hypertime).

52

During the 52 series, a Kryptonian cult attempts to revive Sue from the dead. They attract the attention of a now depowered Ralph Dibny by spray-painting the Kryptonian word for resurrection (the Superman symbol, inverted) on her tombstone. Ralph and a team of heroes infiltrate the resurrection ceremony. Convinced that the ceremony is a hoax, Ralph and the others attack the temple, which subsequently catches on fire. However, Ralph is convinced that the resurrection is not a hoax when a seemingly animated straw representation of Sue crawls towards Ralph uttering his name. Although this straw version of Sue Dibny is destroyed in the fire, Ralph survives and vows to complete Sue's resurrection. However, a later issue revealed that it was Felix Faust who animated the dummy with his powers, and Ralph was aware of Faust's deception but pretends to believe that it was really his wife in order to get close to the villain and his master, Neron.

In the final issue of 52, Sue reappeared alongside Ralph, both as ghosts (he had used a magic artifact to ensure that they would be together in the afterlife), inside of a school where a paranormal event has occurred. Her final line is "Honey, your nose is twitching".

One Year Later
In Batman and the Outsiders #5, it is revealed (after appearing unknown in the previous two issues) that Ralph and Sue have gained or discovered the ability to possess human bodies, like the ability of Boston Brand, AKA Deadman.

Reign in Hell
Sue and Ralph, in their ghostly forms, appear before Doctor Occult with news of the war brewing in Hell. Sent by Giovanni Zatara, who as a member of the Hell Resistance Movement hopes to take advantage of the war, they ask Doctor Occult to aid him in his plan. They then dissipate and leave him to make his decision.

Blackest Night

In Blackest Night #0, Black Hand is seen in a graveyard approaching the graves of Sue Dibny and her husband Ralph. They are revealed as members of the Black Lantern Corps when they attack Hawkgirl and Hawkman; killing the two heroes by ripping their hearts out. Sue, Ralph and the Hawks later join Firestorm and Martian Manhunter in attacking the Flash and Green Lantern. The fight is interrupted by the arrival of the Indigo Tribe, who use their powers to remove Sue and Ralph's rings and blast them to dust. After the "Blackest Night" crisis, the Flash looks around to see if Ralph and Sue were among those resurrected by the White Entity only to be told by Green Lantern they were not coming back.

New 52/Rebirth
Ralph and Sue are eventually revealed to be alive in the New 52 Secret Six series. As a major subplot of the first year, Ralph is in disguise as a member of the team at the behest of the Riddler, who has Sue Dibny in his possession.

The New 52 versions of the characters are only different in appearance; Ralph has a costume with an orange color scheme instead of purple, and Sue has brown hair instead of black and no longer resembles the young Shirley Maclaine who was the model for the character.

Powers and abilities
While alive, Sue Dibny possessed no superhuman abilities. However, she showed herself to be a quick thinker, a decent detective (though not on her husband's level), and multi-lingual (native English, as well as French, Spanish, Italian, and Portuguese). Her appearances as a ghost have shown her with paranormal abilities.

Other versions
In the 1997 Tangent Comics one-shot The Flash, Sue Dearborn appeared as a minor character working as a reporter for All Access interviewing Lia Nelson on her arrival at her film premiere.
In Superman: American Alien, Sue Dearborn encounters a nineteen-year-old Clark Kent while with Oliver Queen, mistakenly believing that he is Bruce Wayne. She introduces him to Vic Zsasz and his unnamed wife.

In other media
Sue Dearbon appears in The CW television series The Flash, portrayed by Natalie Dreyfuss. She is initially alluded to in the fifth season finale before Ralph Dibny works to find her in sixth season. He eventually finds her in Central City, wherein she manipulates him into helping her seek revenge on the crime syndicate Black Hole for extorting her parents. Upon realizing this, Dibny convinces Dearbon to give up her vendetta, only for the latter to be framed by Eva McCulloch for the death of Black Hole's leader, Joseph Carver. In the seventh season, Dearbon and Dibny succeed in clearing her name before leaving to dismantle other Black Hole cells, though Dearbon would return to help the Flash and his allies.

References

DC Comics female characters
Characters created by Carmine Infantino
Characters created by John Broome
Fictional socialites
Comics characters introduced in 1961
Fictional ghosts